Enzo Artoni and Ignacio González King defeated Brian Dabul and Damián Patriarca 6–3, 6–0 in the final.

Seeds

Draw

Draw

External links
Main Draw

2004 Doubles